Jamie Benn (born 1989) is a Canadian ice hockey player.

Jamie Benn may also refer to:

Jamie Benn (rugby league) (born 1977), Scottish rugby league footballer

See also
James R. Benn (born 1949), American writer
Benn (surname)